Sir Frank Arthur Stockdale,  (24 June 1883 – 3 August 1949) was a British agriculturist and colonial agricultural administrator.

Biography 
Stockdale was born in Honington, Lincolnshire, the son of George Stockdale. His family had been landowners in East Anglia for many generations. He was educated at Wisbech Grammar School and Magdalene College, Cambridge, where he was an exhibitioner. He graduated in 1904 joined the Imperial Department of Agriculture for the West Indies as a mycologist and lecturer in agricultural science. He then held a series of agricultural posts in British Guiana, Mauritius, and Ceylon, where he was the Director of Agriculture between 1916 and 1929 and a member of the Legislative Council from 1921 to 1929.

In 1929, a Colonial Agricultural Service was established, and Stockdale was appointed as the first Agricultural Adviser to the Secretary of State for the Colonies, serving until 1940. That year, he was appointed Comptroller for Development and Welfare in the West Indies, holding the post until 1945. At the end of the war he returned to the Colonial Office as adviser on development planning. In 1948 he was appointed vice-chairman of the Colonial Development Corporation.

Stockdale was appointed CBE in 1925, CMG in 1932, KCMG in 1937, and GCMG in 1945.

References 

Fellows of the Linnean Society of London
British agriculturalists
British colonial governors and administrators in Africa
British colonial governors and administrators in Asia
British colonial governors and administrators in the Americas
People educated at Wisbech Grammar School
Alumni of Magdalene College, Cambridge
Members of the Legislative Council of Ceylon
Civil servants in the Colonial Office
Commanders of the Order of the British Empire
Knights Grand Cross of the Order of St Michael and St George
1883 births
1949 deaths
British people in British Guiana
British people in British Mauritius
British people in British Ceylon